La Mañana was an influential Uruguayan daily newspaper.

It was established in 1914 by a group of Colorado politicians and journalists, headed by Pedro Manini Ríos. Up to the 1980s it was published by Seusa, the same company owning another important newspaper, El Diario.
 
It ceased to exist in the late 1990s.

Reopening 
As of 26 June 2019, La Mañana reappeared as a weekly newspaper.

References

1914 establishments in Uruguay
1998 disestablishments in Uruguay
Defunct newspapers published in Uruguay
Mass media in Montevideo
Publications established in 1914
Publications disestablished in 1998
Spanish-language newspapers
Colorado Party (Uruguay)
2019 establishments in Uruguay
Publications established in 2019